The 2007 AFF Championship was the 6th edition of the AFF Championship, the football championship of Southeast Asia. The group stage was co-hosted by Singapore and Thailand from 12 to 17 January. Knockout stage with two-leg Home-and-away format was hosted from 23 January to 4 February 2007.

It was renamed from the Tiger Cup, due to the cup's main sponsor, Tiger Beer, not continuing their title sponsorship. This was the last event held at Singapore's National Stadium before its redevelopment.

Singapore set an AFF Cup record of a 15-match unbeaten run under coach Radojko Avramović, stretching back to the 2004 AFF Championship, and 17-match unbeaten run since the 4–0 defeat at home to neighbours Malaysia in the same competition on 18 December 2002.

Hosts
Group stage was co-hosted Thailand and Singapore from 12 to 17 January 2007. The two hosts are the only two teams that have won the championship since its inception in 1996. Both nations with Malaysia and Vietnam were qualified from group stage and would host the knockout stage with Home-and-away format from 23 to 28 January 2007.

Qualification

The qualifying round for the lower ranked teams in Southeast Asia was held in Bacolod, Philippines from 12–20 November 2006. It was played in a single round-robin format with the top two teams advancing to the finals. This was the first time since 1998 where a qualification tournament was held.

Six teams as qualified directly to the finals.
 
 
 
 
 
 

Two teams qualified via the qualification tournament.
  (Qualification winners)
  (Qualification runner-up)

Qualified teams
The following eight teams qualified for the tournament.

Squads

Venues

Final tournament

Group stage

Group A

 All matches played in Thailand.
 Times listed are UTC+7

Group B

 All matches played in Singapore.
 Times listed are UTC+8

Knockout stage

Note: Although the knockout stages were two-legged, away goals rule was not applied. If the total aggregate score of both teams after both matches remained the same, extra time would have been played, followed by a penalty shootout if necessary.

Semi-finals
First Leg

Second Leg

2–2 on aggregate. Singapore won via a penalty shootout.

Thailand won 2–0 on aggregate.

Final

After a group stage with two pools of four, the two host nations met in a two-game final. In the first leg of the final, a controversial penalty was awarded to Singapore at the 83rd minute of the match, and the Thailand team walked off the pitch as a protest to the referee's decision. The Thailand team returned to the pitch at the 98th minute, and Singapore later won 2-1.

In the second leg of the final, Singapore had a goal controversially chalked off for being offside, but finally drew 1-1 to fellow Thailand, with Khairul Amri scoring the decisive goal in the closing stages of the match, giving Singapore their 2nd title in succession, winning with an aggregate score of 3-2 and successfully defending the title. While Thailand can point to the controversial penalty for their defeat in the first leg, they failed to defeat Singapore in the second leg in Bangkok. It could have been worse for Thailand had the match officials seen Thai midfielder Datsakorn Thonglao headbutt Singapore's Khairul Amri to vent his anger after the equaliser.

First leg

Second leg

Singapore won 3–2 on aggregate.

Awards

Goalscorers
10 goals
  Noh Alam Shah

4 goals
  Pipat Thonkanya
  Phan Thanh Bình

3 goals
  Sarayoot Chaikamdee
  Lê Công Vinh

2 goals

  Atep Rizal
  Saktiawan Sinaga
  Hairuddin Omar
  Khairul Amri
  Muhammad Ridhuan
  Nguyễn Văn Biển

1 goal

  Ilham Jaya Kesuma
  Zaenal Arief
  Sounthalay Saysongkham
  Mohammad Hardi Jaafar
  Eddy Helmi Abdul Manan
  Mohd Nizaruddin Yusof
  Si Thu Win
  Sharil Ishak
  Itimi Dickson
  Indra Sahdan Daud
  Fahrudin Mustafić

Own goal
  Supardi Nasir (playing against Vietnam)
  Anton del Rosario (playing against Malaysia)

Team statistics
This table shows all team performance.

References
 Hamdan Saaid. "ASEAN Football Federation Championship 2007 - Details". RSSSF. Retrieved 2010-03-02.

External links
 ASEAN Football Federation official website

 
1
AFF Championship
AFF Championship
AFF Championship tournaments
International association football competitions hosted by Singapore
International association football competitions hosted by Thailand